Kahumatamomoe (Kahu for short) was an early Māori explorer in Māori traditions. He travelled with his nephew Ihenga from Rotorua to Kaipara Harbour and then alone around the Coromandel Peninsula and back to Rotorua. Lake Rotorua's full name is Te Rotoruanui-a-Kahumatamomoe and was named by Ihenga to honour his uncle.

Genealogy
Tama-te-kapua was Kahumatamomoe's father, who escaped Uenuku's wrath in Hawaiki. Kahu's son was Tawaki-moe-tahanga, whose own son was Uenuku-mai-Rarotonga who married Whakaotirangi, who is not the same Whakaotirangi who came to New Zealand on the Tainui canoe.

References

Māori mythology
New Zealand Māori people
Legendary Māori people